The 2020 Purdue Boilermakers football team represented Purdue University during the 2020 NCAA Division I FBS football season. The Boilermakers played their home games at Ross–Ade Stadium in West Lafayette, Indiana, and competed in the West Division of the Big Ten Conference. They were led by fourth-year head coach Jeff Brohm.

On August 11, 2020, the Big Ten Conference canceled all fall sports competitions due to the COVID-19 pandemic. However, on September 16, the Big Ten reinstated the season, announcing an eight-game season beginning on October 24.

Spring Game
The 2020 Spring Game was scheduled to take place in West Lafayette on April 4, 2020 at 2:00 p.m.; however, on March 12, 2020, the Big Ten Conference canceled the remainder of all winter and spring sports seasons due to the COVID-19 pandemic.

Previous season

The Boilermakers finished the 2019 season 4–8, 3–6 in Big Ten play to finish in a tie for fifth place in the West Division.  Several players received season-ending injuries by the team's fourth game, including All-American wide receiver Rondale Moore, starting quarterback Elijah Sindelar, and defensive captain Markus Bailey.

Offseason

Coaching changes
On December 9, 2019, the Boilermakers announced it had fired co-defensive coordinator and linebackers coach, Nick Holt. On January 2, 2020, Louisiana Tech defensive coordinator, Bob Diaco was named the defensive coordinator and linebackers coach at Purdue. On January 17, 2020, it was announced that Special Teams Coordinator, Kevin Wolthausen and defensive line coach, Reggie Johnson, would not return as assistants in 2020. On January 21, 2020, Purdue hired North Texas special teams coordinator, Marty Biagi, as their new special teams coordinator. On January 22, 2020, Purdue rounded out it's coaching staff with the addition of Air Force defensive line coach, Terrance Jamison.

Transfers

Outgoing

Notable departures from the 2019 squad included:

Incoming

2020 NFL Draft

Boilermakers who were picked in the 2020 NFL Draft:

Schedule
Purdue had games scheduled against Memphis, Air Force, and Boston College, but canceled these games on July 9 due to the Big Ten Conference's decision to play a conference-only schedule due to the COVID-19 pandemic.

The Big Ten released a revised conference schedule, with every team playing a ten-game conference-only season. On September 19, 2020, yet another revised schedule was released, featuring an eight-game conference-only season plus a Championship Week cross-divisional playoff game.

*Wisconsin's game with Purdue was cancelled due to a COVID-19 outbreak at Wisconsin. The game will not be rescheduled. Instead, Wisconsin will have a bye and will have just six games, and Purdue will have a bye and will have just seven games.

*On December 9, Purdue and Indiana announced a mutual one-time cancellation of the Old Oaken Bucket game scheduled for December 12 after team-related activities were paused because of an elevated number of coronavirus cases within both the Boilermakers' and Hoosiers' programs. On December 13, Purdue and Indiana came to a mutual agreement to reschedule the Old Oaken Bucket game for one week later, on December 18; however, on December 15, both teams again mutually agreed to cancel the Friday contest, due to issues remaining on both teams with COVID complications.

Source:

Rankings

Game summaries

Iowa

 Sources:

With the opening of the 2020 season, the Big Ten Conference season opened against the Hawkeyes of Iowa.

Purdue defeated Iowa, 24–20. Purdue opened the scoring when Aidan O'Connell found David Bell from 9-yards out. Iowa would tie the second in the second quarter when Spencer Petras scored from 1-yard out. The Hawkeyes then took the lead when Mekhi Sargent scored on a 1-yard run. Purdue tied the game with 1:40 remaining in the second quarter with a 11-yard Bell reception from O'Connell. Iowa would strike one final time with no time on the clock with a Keith Duncan 27-yard field goal to bring the halftime score to 17–14 in favor of the Hawkeyes. After a scoreless 3rd quarter, Iowa got the first scores of the fourth quarter on a field goal of 33-yards from Duncan to increase the lead to 6. Purdue scored again on a 29-yard J.D. Dellinger field goal. O'Connell would find Bell once more in the endzone for a 6-yard touchdown pass, and the Purdue defense would stop Iowa on 4 downs on the ensuing possession to seal the Boilermaker victory.

Purdue's October 24 season opening game was the latest season opener since 1918. Bell's three touchdown receptions were the first three or more touchdown receptions in a game since Terry Wright had three against Iowa on November 3, 2018. J.D. Dellinger's field goal was the 34th of his career and moved him into fifth all-time in Purdue history for most field goals made.

at Illinois

 Sources:

Purdue's next game would be on the road as they traveled to Champaign, Illinois to face off against the Illinois Fighting Illini for the Purdue Cannon.

Purdue defeated Illinois, 31–24. Purdue opened the scoring when Zander Horvath scored from the 1-yard line. Purdue would extend their lead in the second quarter when Aidan O'Connell found Milton Wright for 45-yard touchdown reception. The Fighting Illini then got on the scoreboard when Mike Epstein scored on a 7-yard run. The two teams would trade field goals to bring the halftime score to 17–10 in favor of the Boilermakers. Purdue extended their lead in the third quarter when O'Connell found David Bell on a 3-yard reception. The Boilermakers would strike again when Marvin Grant forced a Coran Taylor fumbler, recovered by Jalen Graham in the endzone. The Fighting Illini started their comeback when Taylor found Daniel Imatorbhebehe over the middle for a 28-yard reception and a 9-yard Brian Hightower touchdown catch from Taylor. Illinois was knocking on the door inside the Purdue 20 on their final possession, but were stopped short giving Purdue the 31–24 victory

Purdue's 2–0 start was their best since 2007, and that squad opened 5–0. Bell's minimum of 100 yards receiving for the fifth consecutive game for the same stat.

at Wisconsin (canceled) 

The Purdue at Wisconsin game was canceled due to a COVID-19 outbreak at Wisconsin. The game will not be rescheduled. Instead, the Purdue Boilermakers will have a bye, and will play just seven games.

Northwestern

 Sources:

Purdue would return home to face the Northwestern Wildcats in a battle for first place in the West Division of the Big Ten.

Northwestern defeated Purdue, 27–20.

at Minnesota

Rutgers

Nebraska

at Indiana

Roster

Awards and honors

Players drafted into the NFL

References

Purdue
Purdue Boilermakers football seasons
Purdue Boilermakers football